Karadiken (literally black thorn) is a Turkish place name and it may refer to;
Karadiken, Ulus a village in Ulus district of Bartın Province
Karadiken, Sütçüler, a village, in Sütçiler district of Isparta Provinve
Karadiken, Tarsus, a village in Tarsus district of Mersin Province
Karadiken, Mut a village in Mut district of Mersin Province